Cremastobombycia lantanella, the lantana leaf miner, is a moth of the family Gracillariidae. It was first described by August Busck in 1910. It is native to the southern United States (including Texas) and Mexico. It was introduced to Hawaii in 1902 to aid in the control of Lantana plants.

The wingspan is about 7 mm. Adults are very light brown with whitish bars on the forewings.

The larvae feed on Lantana species, including L. urticoides, L. urticifolia, L. hispida, L. hirsuta and L. camara. They mine the leaves of their host plant. The mine consists of a large bulged or inflated mine on the leaf, equally visible on both sides of the leaf. There may be as many as twenty larvae per leaf. The larvae are pale green.

Pupation takes place in a white, spindle-shaped ribbed cocoon of about 5 mm long which is suspended in the mine by a silken thread attached at each end.

External links

Lithocolletinae
Leaf miners

Moths of North America
Lepidoptera of the United States
Lepidoptera of Mexico
Taxa named by August Busck
Moths described in 1910